Stockton-on-Tees is a former borough constituency represented in the House of Commons of the Parliament of the United Kingdom. It elected one Member of Parliament (MP) by the first past the post system of election from 1868 to 1983.

History
The constituency was created as the parliamentary borough of Stockton by the Reform Act 1867, but was named as Stockton-on-Tees under the Boundary Act 1868. It included Thornaby-on-Tees until the redistribution of seats for the 1950 general election.

In 1966, the borough of Stockton was absorbed into the newly created County Borough of Teesside and at the next periodic review of parliamentary constituencies which came into effect for the February 1974 election, it was officially named as Teesside, Stockton. A further local government reorganisation which came into effect in April 1974 saw Stockton re-established as a borough within the new county of Cleveland and, at the next redistribution which did not come into effect until the 1983 election, the Stockton-on-Tees constituency was abolished. The majority of the electorate, including Stockton town centre, Norton and Billingham were included in the new Stockton North seat, with parts included in Stockton South.

Boundaries

1868–1918 
Under the Reform Act 1867, the proposed contents of the new parliamentary borough were defined as the municipal borough of Stockton, and the township of Thornaby. However, this was amended under the Boundary Act 1868, with the boundary being extended to include the whole of the parish of Stockton, part of the township of Linthorpe and most of the parish of Norton.

See map on Vision of Britain website.

1918–1950 
The Boroughs of Stockton-on-Tees and Thornaby-on-Tees.

Minor changes. Boundaries aligned to those of the local authorities.

1950–1974 
The Borough of Stockton-on-Tees.

Thornaby-on-Tees transferred to Middlesbrough West.

1974-1983 (Teesside, Stockton) 
The County Borough of Teesside wards of Billingham East, Billingham West, Grangefield, Hartburn, Mile House, North End, Norton, Stockton South.

Billingham transferred from the abolished constituency of Sedgefield.

Members of Parliament

Elections

Elections in the 1860s

Elections in the 1870s

Elections in the 1880s

Dodds resigned, causing a by-election.

Elections in the 1890s

Elections in the 1900s

Elections in the 1910s

Elections in the 1920s

Elections in the 1930s 

Communist Party candidate George Short submitted correct nomination papers but refused to submit the required deposit of £150, so his nomination was rejected.

Elections in the 1940s 
General Election 1939–40:
Another General Election was required to take place before the end of 1940. The political parties had been making preparations for an election to take place from 1939 and by the end of this year, the following candidates had been selected; 
Conservative: Harold Macmillan
Labour: J Erskine Harper
Liberal: Gerald Tossell

Elections in the 1950s

Elections in the 1960s

Elections in the 1970s

See also

 History of parliamentary constituencies and boundaries in Durham

References

Craig, F. W. S. (1983). British parliamentary election results 1918–1949 (3 ed.). Chichester: Parliamentary Research Services. .

Sources
 

Politics of the Borough of Stockton-on-Tees
Parliamentary constituencies in North East England (historic)
Constituencies of the Parliament of the United Kingdom established in 1868
Constituencies of the Parliament of the United Kingdom disestablished in 1983